Lone Tree is an unincorporated community in Cass County, in the U.S. state of Missouri.

History
A post office called Lonetree was established in 1883, and remained in operation until 1916. The community took its name from a large individual oak tree near the original town site.

References

Unincorporated communities in Cass County, Missouri
Unincorporated communities in Missouri